was a town located in Usa District, Ōita Prefecture, Japan.

As of 2003, the town had an estimated population of 7,879 and the density of 53.54 persons per km2. The total area was 147.17 km2.

On March 31, 2005, Ajimu, along with the town of Innai (also from Usa District), was merged into the expanded city of Usa.

Dissolved municipalities of Ōita Prefecture